Relax Satya  is a 2019 Indian Kannada language crime thriller film written and directed by Naveen Reddy G. The film is produced by Mohan Kumar H. R., G. Mohan Reddy and Chethan B. R. under the banner Red Dragon. It features Prabhu Mundkur and Manvitha Kamath in the lead role. The score and soundtrack for the film is by Anand Rajavikram and the cinematography is by Yogi. The editing for the film was done by Srikanth. The film was released on 15 November 2019. The movie was reported to be inspired by the British film The Disappearance of Alice Creed (2019).

Cast 

 Prabhu Mundkur as Satya
 Manvitha Kamath as Maaya

Release and reception 
The film was released on 15 November 2019.

The Times of India paper gave 3 out of 5 stars stating "A quick-paced narration might have worked better for the film. It would have enhanced the suspense factor and kept the audience on the edge of their seats. Head to Relax Satya if crime thrillers are your cup of tea. Despite the length, this is a good attempt and is a relatively fresh story for the Kannada audiences."

Soundtrack 
The film's background score and the soundtracks are composed by Anand Rajavikram. The music rights were acquired by Ananda Audio.

References

External links 
 

2010s Kannada-language films
2019 crime thriller films
Indian crime thriller films
2019 films
Films shot in Mysore
Films shot in Bangalore